Christopher Ifekandu Okigbo (16 August 1932 – 1967) was a Nigerian poet, teacher, and librarian, who died fighting for the independence of Biafra. He is today widely acknowledged as an outstanding postcolonial English-language African poet and one of the major modernist writers of the 20th century.

Early life
His father was a teacher in Catholic missionary schools during the heyday of British colonial rule in Nigeria, and Okigbo spent his early years moving from station to station. Despite his father's devout Christianity, Okigbo had an affinity, and came to believe later in his life, that in him was reincarnated the soul of his maternal grandfather, a priest of Idoto, an Igbo deity. Idoto is personified in the river of the same name that flows through Okigbo's village, and the "water goddess" figures prominently in his work. Heavensgate (1962) opens with the lines:

Before you, mother Idoto,
naked I stand,

while in "Distances" (1964), he celebrates his final aesthetic and psychic return to his indigenous religious roots:

I am the sole witness to my homecoming.

Another influential figure in Okigbo's early years was his older brother Pius Okigbo, who would later become the renowned economist and first Nigerian Ambassador to the European Economic Commission (EU).

Days at Umuahia and Ibadan
Okigbo graduated from Government College Umuahia (in present Abia State, Nigeria) two years after Chinua Achebe, another noted Nigerian writer, having earned himself a reputation as both a voracious reader and a versatile athlete. The following year, he was accepted to University College in Ibadan (now known as University of Ibadan). Originally intending to study Medicine, he switched to Classics in his second year. In college, he also earned a reputation as a gifted pianist, accompanying Wole Soyinka in his first public appearance as a singer. It is believed that Okigbo also wrote original music at that time, though none of this has survived.

Work and art
Upon graduating in 1956, he held a succession of jobs in various locations throughout the country, while making his first forays into poetry. He worked at the Nigerian Tobacco Company, United Africa Company, the Fiditi Grammar School (where he taught Latin), and finally as Assistant Librarian at the University of Nigeria in Nsukka, where he helped to found the African Authors Association.

During those years, he began publishing his work in various journals, notably Black Orpheus, a literary journal intended to bring together the best works of African and African-American writers. While his poetry can be read in part as powerful expression of postcolonial African nationalism, he was adamantly opposed to Negritude, which he denounced as a romantic pursuit of the "mystique of blackness" for its own sake; he similarly rejected the conception of a commonality of experience between Africans and black Americans, a stark philosophical contrast to the editorial policy of Black Orpheus. It was on precisely these grounds that he rejected the first prize in African poetry awarded to him at the 1966 World Festival of Negro Arts in Dakar, while declaring that there is no such thing as a Negro or black poet.

In 1963, he left Nsukka to assume the position of West African Representative of Cambridge University Press at Ibadan, a position affording the opportunity to travel frequently to the United Kingdom, where he attracted further attention. At Ibadan, he became an active member of the Mbari literary club, and completed, composed or published the works of his mature years, including Limits (1964), Silences (1962–65), Lament of the Masks (commemorating the centenary of the birth of W. B. Yeats in the forms of a Yoruba praise poem, 1964), Dance of the Painted Maidens (commemorating the 1964 birth of his daughter, Obiageli or Ibrahimat, whom he regarded as a reincarnation of his mother) and his final highly prophetic sequence, Path of Thunder (1965–67), which was published posthumously in 1971 with his magnum opus, Labyrinths, which incorporates the poems from the earlier collections.

War
In 1966 the Nigerian crisis came to a head. Okigbo, living in Ibadan at the time, relocated to eastern Nigeria to await the outcome of the turn of events which culminated in the secession of the eastern provinces as independent Biafra on 30 May 1967. Living in Enugu, he worked together with Achebe to establish a new publishing house, Citadel Press.

With the secession of Biafra, Okigbo immediately joined the new state's military as a volunteer, field-commissioned major. An accomplished soldier, he was killed in action during a major push by Nigerian troops against Nsukka, the university town where he found his voice as a poet, and which he vowed to defend with his life.

Legacy
In July 1967, his hilltop house at Enugu, where several of his unpublished writings (perhaps including the beginnings of a novel) were, was destroyed in a bombing raid by the Nigerian air force. Also destroyed was Pointed Arches, an autobiography in verse which he describes in a letter to his friend and biographer, Sunday Anozie, as an account of the experiences of life and letters which conspired to sharpen his creative imagination.

Several of his unpublished papers are, however, known to have survived the war. Inherited by his daughter, Obiageli, who established the Christopher Okigbo Foundation in 2005 to perpetuate his legacy, the papers were catalogued in January 2006 by Chukwuma Azuonye, Professor of African Literature at the University of Massachusetts Amherst, Boston, who assisted the foundation in nominating them for The United Nations Educational, Scientific and Cultural Organization (UNESCO) Memory of the World Register. Azuonye's preliminary studies of the papers indicate that, apart from new poems in English, including drafts of an Anthem for Biafra, Okigbo's unpublished papers include poems written in Igbo language. The Igbo poems are fascinating in that they open up new vistas in the study of Okigbo's poetry, countering the views of some critics, especially the troika (Chinweizu, Onwuchekwa Jemie and Ihechukwu Madubuike) in their 1980 Towards the Decolonization of African Literature, that he sacrificed his indigenous African sensibility in pursuit of obscurantist Euro-modernism.

"Elegy for Alto", the final poem in Path of Thunder, is today widely read as the poet's "last testament" embodying a prophecy of his own death as a sacrificial lamb for human freedom:

Earth, unbind me; let me be the prodigal; let this be
the ram’s ultimate prayer to the tether...

AN OLD STAR departs, leaves us here on the shore
Gazing heavenward for a new star approaching;
The new star appears, foreshadows its going
Before a going and coming that goes on forever....

The Okigbo Award was established by Wole Soyinka in his honor, in 1987. The first winner was Jean-Baptiste Tati Loutard, for La Tradition du Songe (1985).

See also
Pius Okigbo

References

Sources
Sunday Anozie, Christopher Okigbo: Creative Rhetoric. London: Evan Brothers Ltd., and New York: Holmes and Meier, Inc., 1972.
Uzoma Esonwanne, ed. 2000. Critical Essays on Christopher Okigbo. New York: G. K. Hall & Co.
Ali Mazrui, The Trial of Christopher Okigbo. A Novel. London: Heinemann, 1971.
Donatus Ibe Nwoga, Critical Perspectives on Christopher Okigbo, An Original by Three Continents Press, 1984.
Christopher Okigbo, Labyrinths with "Path of Thunder", Africana Publishing Corporation, New York, 1971.
Dubem Okafor, Dance of Death: Nigerian History and Christopher Okigbo’s Poetry. Trenton, NJ, and Asmara, Eritrea: Africa World Press, 1998.
Udoeyop, Nyong J., Three Nigerian Poets: A Critical Study of the Poetry of Soyinka, Clark, and Okigbo. Ibadan: Ibadan University Press, 1973.
James Wieland, The Ensphering Mind: History, Myth and Fictions in the Poetry of Allen Curnow, Nissim Ezekiel. A. D. Hope, A. M. Klein, Christopher Okigbo and Derek Walcott. Washington, DC: Three Continents Press, 1988.
 Don't Let Him Die, an anthology of memorial poems in honour of Christopher Okigbo on the 10 anniversary of his death, edited by Chinua Achebe and Dubem Okafor. Enugu, Nigeria: Fourth Dimension Publishers, 1978.
 See also for more details on Okigbo, Crossroads: an anthology of poems in honour of Christopher Okigbo on the 40th anniversary of his death, edited by Patrick Oguejiofor and Uduma Kalu (Lagos, Nigeria: Apex Books Limited, 2008).
 See also the most recent publication on Okigbo (published June 2017) written by Bolaji S. Ramos is "The Battlefield Poet: Elegy for Christopher Okigbo", termed as the first full-length performance poetry on Okigbo since his death in 1967. (https://www.amazon.co.uk/Battlefield-Poet-Christopher-Okigbo.../B0737HFSXD);(https://www.amazon.com/dp/B0737HFSXD); The Sun Paper: www.sunnewsonline.com/lagos-lawyer-summons-the-ghost-of-chris-okigbo/
 The most authoritative published source on Okigbo to date is Obi Nwakanma's Christopher Okigbo, 1930–67: Thirsting for Sunlight (Woodbridge: James Currey, 2010).
 "Brecht’s and Okigbo’s work represent two different political approaches to modernism" - essay with approaches to Okigbo's work via intercessions into the work. Brecht, Derrida and Foucault

External links
  Christopher Okigbo Foundation website 

1932 births
1967 deaths
University of Ibadan alumni
Igbo poets
Nigerian male poets
Academic staff of the University of Nigeria
20th-century Nigerian poets
Military personnel killed in the Nigerian Civil War
20th-century male writers
Government College Umuahia alumni
Nigerian librarians